Ouley Hill is 180 m high and lies in County Down Northern Ireland between Carryduff and Saintfield. Its name is derived 

It was the site of a battle in the Irish Rebellion of 1798.

Ouley Hill is accessible by the Killinure Road which runs across the highest part, there are several side road networks which straddle the peak, including Ouley Road itself.

References

Mountains and hills of County Down